The 1942 Volta a Catalunya was the 22nd edition of the Volta a Catalunya cycle race and was held from 5 to 13 September 1942. The race started and finished in Barcelona. The race was won by Federico Ezquerra.

Route and stages

General classification

References

1941
Volta
1942 in Spanish road cycling
September 1942 sports events